Cymindis vaporariorum is a species of ground beetle in the subfamily Harpalinae. It was described by Carl Linnaeus in 1758. Most adults are collected in June and July, but likely are around all summer.

References

vaporariorum
Beetles described in 1758
Taxa named by Carl Linnaeus